South Korea is made up of 17 first-tier administrative divisions: 6 metropolitan cities (gwangyeoksi ), 1 special city (teukbyeolsi ), 1 special self-governing city (teukbyeol-jachisi ), and 9 provinces (do ), including one special self-governing province (teukbyeol jachido ). These are further subdivided into a variety of smaller entities, including cities (si ), counties (gun ), districts (gu ), towns (eup ), townships (myeon ), neighborhoods (dong ) and villages (ri ).

Local government 
Official Revised Romanization of Korean spellings are used

Provincial-level divisions 

The top tier of administrative divisions are the provincial-level divisions, of which there are several types: provinces (including special self-governing provinces), metropolitan cities, special cities, and special self-governing cities. The governors of the provincial-level divisions are elected every four years.

Municipal-level divisions

Si (city) 

A si (pronounced ) is one of the divisions of a province, along with gun. A city must have a neighborhood(dong) and can have towns(eup), townships(myeon) if the city is combined with urban and rural areas. Once an eup of a county (gun) attains a population of 50,000, the county can become a city. A city with a population of over 500,000 (such as Suwon, Cheongju, Cheonan and Jeonju) is considered as a specific city, which can set non-autonomous districts(gu). An administrative city doesn't have a city council and the mayor of the city is appointed by the provincial governor.

Gun (county) 

A gun is one of the divisions of a province (along with si), and of the metropolitan cities of Busan, Daegu, Incheon and Ulsan (along with gu). A gun has a population of less than 150,000 (more than that would make it a city or si), is less densely populated than a gu, and is more rural in character than either of the other 2 divisions. Gun are comparable to British non-metropolitan districts. Counties are divided into towns (eup) and townships (myeon). Specially, the size of a "gun" is less than a US "county".

Gu (district) 

A gu is equivalent to district in the West. The metropolitan cities of Busan, Daegu, Incheon and Ulsan contain gun as well. Gu are similar to boroughs in some Western countries, and a gu office handles many of the functions that would be handled by the city in other jurisdictions. Gu are divided into neighborhoods (dong).

Submunicipal level divisions

Eup (town) 

An eup is similar to the unit of town. Along with myeon, an eup is one of the divisions of a county (gun), and of some cities (si) with a population of less than 500,000. The main town or towns in a county—or the secondary town or towns within a city's territory—are designated as eup. Towns are subdivided into villages (ri). In order to form an eup, the minimum population required is 20,000.

Myeon (township) 

A myeon is one of the divisions – along with eup – of a county (gun) and some cities (si) of fewer than 500,000 population. Myeons have smaller populations than eup and represent the rural areas of a county or city. Myeon are subdivided into villages (ri). The minimum population limit is 6,000.

Dong (neighborhood) 

A dong is the primary division of districts (gu), and of those cities (si) which are not divided into districts. The dong is the smallest level of urban government to have its own office and staff. In some cases, a single legal dong is divided into several administrative dong. Administrative dong are usually distinguished from one another by number (as in the case of Myeongjang 1-dong and Myeongjang 2-dong). In such cases, each administrative dong has its own office and staff.

The primary division of a dong is the tong, but divisions at this level and below are seldom used in daily life. Some populous dong are subdivided into ga, which are not a separate level of government, but only exist for use in addresses. Many major thoroughfares in Seoul, Suwon, and other cities are also subdivided into ga.

Ri (village) 

A ri is the only division of towns (eup) and townships (myeon). The ri is the smallest level of rural government to contain any significant number of people.

History 
Although the details of local administration have changed over time, the basic outline of the current three-tiered system was implemented under the reign of Gojong in 1895. A similar system also remains in use in North Korea.

See also 
 Administrative divisions of North Korea
 ISO 3166-2:KR, ISO codes for cities and provinces in South Korea
 List of cities in South Korea
 List of South Korean regions by GDP
 Provinces of Korea
 Special cities of South Korea

References

External links 
 
 
 
 

 
Korea, South
Lists of subdivisions of South Korea